Tim Greimel is an American politician from Michigan, who currently serves as the Mayor of Pontiac, Michigan. He previously served as a member of the Michigan House of Representatives, elected in a special election in 2012 to fill a vacancy created by the resignation of Tim Melton. After his election to a full term in 2012, he was elected by his colleagues to serve as the minority leader in the House.

In October 2017, Greimel announced his candidacy for the United States House of Representatives, representing Michigan's 11th congressional district but in the Democratic primaries on August 7, 2018, he lost with 21.8 percent of the votes to Haley Stevens who obtained 27 percent of the votes.

In November 2021, he was elected as Mayor of Pontiac, Michigan.

References

Living people
Democratic Party members of the Michigan House of Representatives
University of Michigan alumni
Year of birth missing (living people)
21st-century American politicians